George Christian T. Chia (born August 19, 1979), better known as Gec Chia, is a Filipino business executive and former professional basketball player.

Amateur career
Chia initially wanted to play tennis, but due to the growing popularity of basketball in Zamboanga, he started to play for St. Joseph High School. He went on to represent Zamboanga in the Palarong Pambansa. Despite being a high-school standout, he was not recruited by any Metro Manila programs.

Chia went on to major in computer science in Ateneo de Manila University, where he was an intramurals legend for the CERSA team in the intramurals. He was noticed by then-coach Joe Lipa and was added to the Blue Eagles roster in the 2001 season. He rode the bench, substituting for players such as LA Tenorio and Wesley Gonzales. He played three games and scored a grand total of 10 points throughout the 2001 season. With Ateneo failing to win the Finals, Ateneo fired Lipa and hired former Mapúa Cardinals coach Joel Banal.

The Blue Eagles advanced to the playoffs in 2002 as the third seed after beating the rival  De La Salle Green Archers in the end of the elimination round denying them of a 14–0 sweep. As the third seed, Ateneo had to beat #2 seed UE Red Warriors twice in the semifinals in order to advance to the Finals. LA Tenorio, who had just returned from an injury, led the Eagles to a Game 1 triumph to set a winner-take-all game to face La Salle who had just eliminated the UST Growling Tigers.

With 7.8 seconds left in Game 2, and the score tied at 70–all, UE player Paul Artadi turned over the ball. Tenorio raced towards the other end of the court but was well covered by the bigger James Yap. Tenorio passed the ball to Chia, who shook off Ronald Tubid, and made the shot over the outstretched hands of Olan Omiping. The shot brought Banal to his knees and he later described the shot as "a miracle."

In the Finals, Chia scored 5 points in a Game 1 win, fouled out with 4 points in a Game 2 loss, and 11 points in Ateneo's title-clinching Game 3 win.

Professional career
Chia was selected twenty-eighth overall in the 2003 PBA Draft by the Coca-Cola Tigers. He was later signed by the Barangay Ginebra Kings, and was part of the 2008-09 PBA Philippine Cup Talk 'N Text Tropang Texters champion team. He then became a free agent, eventually being signed by the Barako Bull Energy Boosters early in the 2009-10 KFC-PBA Philippine Cup.

Life after basketball
Chia is currently the managing director of Poliform, a company that produces high-end Italian modular home line in the Philippines.

References

External links
Gec Chia at PBA.ph
Gec Chia's buzzer-beater in the 2002 UAAP semifinals

1979 births
Living people
People from Zamboanga City
Ateneo Blue Eagles men's basketball players
Filipino men's basketball players
Point guards
Shooting guards
Powerade Tigers players
Barangay Ginebra San Miguel players
TNT Tropang Giga players
Barako Bull Energy Boosters players
Powerade Tigers draft picks